Unbroken is the second full-length album from Canadian heavy metal band A Perfect Murder. It was released by Victory Records on 13 July 2004 and contains a total of fourteen tracks. The music was produced by Eric Rachel.

Track listing

 "Jaded"  – 2:09
 "Possessed"  – 2:56
 "Time Bomb"  – 2:53
 "Speak Without Faith"  – 1:57
 "Slave To The Clock"  – 2:22
 "Unbroken"  – 3:09
 "No Truce"  – 2:00
 "Eye For An Eye"  – 2:36
 "Savior"  – 2:06
 "Bouc Emissaire"  – 1:56
 "Die With Regret"  – 2:58
 "No Pulse In My Veins"  – 4:01
 "Another Day, Another Plague"  – 3:40
 "Untitled" (Bonus Track) - 1:36

References

A Perfect Murder (band) albums
2004 albums
Victory Records albums